MINT is an acronym referring to the economies of Mexico, Indonesia, Nigeria, and Turkey. The term was originally coined in 2014 by Fidelity Investments, a Boston-based asset management firm, and was popularized by Jim O'Neill of Goldman Sachs, who had created the term BRIC. The term is primarily used in the economic and financial spheres as well as in academia. Its usage has grown specially in the investment sector, where it is used to refer to the bonds issued by these governments. These four countries are also part of the "Next Eleven".

Thesis
In a column for Bloomberg View a few years after Fidelity coined the term, O'Neill discussed the "MINT" economies:

I spent last week in Indonesia, working on a series for BBC Radio about four of the world's most populous non-BRIC emerging economies. The BRIC countriesBrazil, Russia, India and Chinaare already closely watched. The group I'm studying for this projectlet's call them the MINT economiesdeserve no less attention. Mexico, Indonesia, Nigeria and Turkey all have very favorable demographics for at least the next 20 years, and their economic prospects are interesting.

Policy makers and thinkers in the MINT countries have often asked me why I left them out of that first classification. Indonesians made the point with particular force. Over the years I've become accustomed to being told that the BRIC countries should have been the BRIICs all along, or maybe even the BIICs. Wasn't Indonesia's economic potential more compelling than Russia's? Despite the size of its relatively young population (a tremendous asset), I thought it unlikely that Indonesia would do enough on the economic-policy front to quickly realize that potential.

Now, meeting a diverse group of Indonesiansfrom the leading candidates for the 2014 presidential elections to shoppers in Jakarta's busy mallsI found a healthy preoccupation with the country's economic prospects. "Could Indonesia do what's needed to lift the country's growth rate to 7 percent or more," they were asking, "or would it have to settle for 'just' 5 percent?"

Country data 

Data for Columns 2 to 9 from the World Bank.
Data for HDI from the UN Development Programme.

Mexico

The economy of Mexico is the 15th largest in the world in nominal terms and the 11th largest by purchasing power parity, according to the International Monetary Fund.
Since the 1994 crisis, administrations have improved the country's macroeconomic fundamentals. Due to Mexico's rapidly advancing infrastructure, increasing middle class and rapidly declining poverty rates it is expected to have a higher GDP per capita than all but three European economies by 2050. This newfound local wealth also contributes to the nation's economy by creating a large domestic consumer market, which in turn creates more jobs.

The economy contains rapidly developing modern industrial and service sectors, with increasing private ownership. Recent administrations have expanded competition in ports, railroads, telecommunications, electricity generation, natural gas distribution and airports, with the aim of upgrading infrastructure. As an export-oriented economy, more than 90% of Mexican trade is under free trade agreements (FTAs) with more than 40 countries, including the European Union, Japan, Israel, and much of Central and South America. The private sector in Mexico is one of the most important players in the national economy, with the country's single securities market the second largest in Latin America (after Brazil's BM&F Bovespa), and 16 companies on the Forbes Global 2000 list of the world's largest companies in 2008.

In December 2012, the administration of incumbent president Enrique Peña Nieto passed the Pact for Mexico, a series of far reaching reforms in a wide array of areas, including telecommunications reform, educational reform, fiscal reform, banking reform, energy reform, and legal reform. These are expected to help realise Mexico's economic potential by increasing competitiveness, further opening various sectors of the Mexican economy, and capitalise on Mexico's labour force to increase productivity.

Indonesia

With its large population, Indonesia will be ranked seventh in GDP by 2050 according to Jim O'Neill about BRIC and other prominent countries. Indonesia has a mixed economy in which both the private sector and government play significant roles. The country is the largest economy in Southeast Asia and a member of the G-20 major economies. Currently, Indonesia has the world's 8th largest GDP-PPP and 16th largest nominal GDP.

Indonesia is the world's fourth most populous country after China, India, and the United States and the world's third most populous democratic country after India and the United States. In 2009, BRIC and Indonesia represented about 42 and 3 percent of the world's population respectively and about 15 percent of global GDP altogether. All of them are G-20 countries. By 2015, Internet users in BRIC and Indonesia will double to 1.2 billion. At 2009, Indonesia was the only member of the G20 to lower its public debt-to-GDP ratio – a positive economic management indicator.

Nigeria

Nigeria is a middle-income mixed economy and emerging market with expanding financial, service, communications, and entertainment sectors. It is ranked 20th (40th in 2005, 52nd in 2000), in the world in terms of Gross Domestic Product at purchasing power parity as of 2015, and largest within Africa, on track to become one of the 20 largest economies in the world in terms of nominal GDP by 2020. Its re-emergent, though currently under-performing, manufacturing sector is one of the largest on the continent, and produces a large proportion of goods and services for the West African region.

Turkey

Turkey's economy grew at 9.2% in 2010, faster than India and China, and was the third fastest-growing economy in the world. Economic growth came mainly from construction, rather than exports like China and Russia. Construction alone makes up 6% of the Turkish economy, but if one counts the various industries related to construction (steel, timber, energy used and purchased) construction and the related industries made up some 30% of the economy. Turkey also has a very large domestic consumption base, and some three major auto companies.
In 2022, Turkey had the world's 11th largest GDP-PPP and 20th largest nominal GDP. By 2030, this nominal GDP is set to grow to $9 trillion to become the 5th largest GDP PPP in the world. The country is a founding member of the OECD (1961) and the G-20 major economies (1999). Since December 31, 1995, it has been part of the EU Customs Union. Mean wages were $8.71 per man-hour in 2009. Turkey grew at an average rate of 7.5 percent between 2002 and 2006, faster than any other OECD country.

According to a survey by Forbes magazine, Istanbul, Turkey's financial capital, in 2012, was ranked fifth in the world in number of billionaires with 30 (up two from 28 in 2010), behind Moscow (78 billionaires), New York City (57 billionaires), London (39 billionaires), and Hong Kong (38 billionaires). Turkey's major cities and its Aegean coastline attract millions of visitors every year.

The CIA classifies Turkey as a developed country. It is often classified as a newly industrialized country by economists and political scientists.

Current leaders

See also
 BRICS
 D-8 Organization for Economic Cooperation
 E7
 Emerging and growth-leading economies
 Emerging power
 List of country groupings
 List of multilateral free-trade agreements
 MIKTA
 The Pacific Pumas
 Tiger Cub Economies
 VISTA (economics)

References

External links
 Centre for Rising Powers, University of Cambridge

Economic country classifications
Economy of Indonesia
Economy of Mexico
Economy of Nigeria
Economy of Turkey